Knuffle Bunny Free: An Unexpected Diversion is a children's picture book that was both written and illustrated Mo Willems. It was released on September 28, 2010, by Balzer + Bray, an imprint of HarperCollins. It is the third and final book in Willems' Knuffle Bunny series, which also includes Knuffle Bunny: A Cautionary Tale and Knuffle Bunny Too: A Case of Mistaken Identity.

Awards and accolades 
It debuted at the number one spot on The New York Times Best Seller list. Amazon.com named the book one of its Top 10 Children's Picture Books of 2010. Willems was a finalist for Illustrator of the Year during 2011's Children's Book Week, sponsored by the Children's Book Council of the United States because of his efforts in illustrating this book.

Animated short cartoon 
In 2012, a 13-minute animated short film, starring Trixie, Mo, and Cher Willems as narrators, and animated by Karen Villarreal, was released by Weston Woods Studios, Inc.

Plot

Trixie Willems and her family take a trip to visit her grandparents in Holland. She accidentally leaves her beloved stuffed toy rabbit, Knuffle Bunny, on the airplane and does not realize the toy bunny is missing  until it is too late. Knuffle Bunny is on his way to China. Trixie's family reassures her that she is getting older, so she must try to have courage. Still sad, Trixie goes to bed. She dreams of all the fantastic places Knuffle Bunny will visit and all of the fun things he will do. This brightens her mood considerably and comforts her. Soon, her vacation is over, and she gets on the airplane to fly back home to New York City. Surprisingly, it is the same plane as before, and Knuffle Bunny is waiting for her in a seat pocket. Trixie is excited until she sees a baby crying on the airplane and gives Knuffle Bunny to the baby for comfort.

Epilogue
In an epilogue, the author Mo Willems wishes the real Trixie, his daughter, a happy and fulfilling life, and predicts that Knuffle Bunny will someday return as a playmate for his daughter's own child.

References 

2010 children's books
American picture books
HarperCollins books
Books about rabbits and hares